is a railway station on the Yokosuka Line in Kamakura, Kanagawa, Japan, operated by East Japan Railway Company (JR East).

Lines
Kita-Kamakura Station is located on the Yokosuka Line and is also served by Shōnan-Shinjuku Line through services. It is located 2.3 km from the junction at Ōfuna Station, and 51.7 km from Tokyo Station.

Station layout

Kita-Kamakura Station has two opposed side platforms serving two tracks, which are connected by a level crossing at the Kamakura end of the platforms. The station building is located on the side of the up (Tokyo-bound) track at the end of the platform nearest to Kamakura. To reach the down platform, passengers must cross the tracks via a level-crossing.

However, during the morning school commute time only, students of the Kamakura Gakuen schools and Kita-Kamakura Joshi Gakuen schools can exit without passing through the ticket gates, via a temporary exit. This exit does not have a ticket gate.

On the side of the tracks leading away from Tokyo there is special exit which, like the Front Exit, is usable all day. It is mainly intended for disembarking, but passengers who already have a ticket from this station, or who are using a Suica or Suica-affiliated IC card can enter here. There is no automatic ticket gate, and only a very simple Suica touch point. There is one more special exit on the same side of the tracks, near the middle of the platform. It is only usable during the morning rush hour, Golden Week, and other times when the station is very crowded. During crowded weekend days and holidays there is a station attendant manning the ticket gate there, allowing payment in cash. A simple Suica touch point was installed in 2008.

Although the current station includes many stairs, there is a plan to make the station barrier-free, to be completed in 2013. According to the plan, elevators will be installed where there are stairs, both platforms will have wheelchair ramps, extending the platforms by seven meters, the entire platforms will be covered by a roof, and a multi-purpose toilet will be installed.

Platforms

History
Kita-Kamakura Station opened 20 May 1927 as a station on the Japanese Government Railways (JGR), the pre-war predecessor to the Japanese National Railways (JNR) to serve the Yokosuka Naval Arsenal and related Imperial Japanese Navy facilities at Yokosuka. It was initially a temporary stop, in operation from the months of May through October, but was upgraded to a full station on 1 October 1930, at which time the present station building was completed. The station came under the management of JR East upon the privatization of the Japanese National Railways (JNR) on 1 April 1987.

Surrounding area
Kita-Kamakura Station is close to three major Buddhist temples: Engaku-ji, Kenchō-ji, and Tōkei-ji.

References
 Harris, Ken and Clarke, Jackie. Jane's World Railways 2008-2009. Jane's Information Group (2008).

External links

 Kita-Kamakura Station information 

Railway stations in Kanagawa Prefecture
Yokosuka Line
Shōnan-Shinjuku Line
Buildings and structures in Kamakura, Kanagawa
Railway stations in Japan opened in 1927